T. J. Hooks was an American politician who served as a member of the Florida House of Representatives.

Hooks was elected to the Florida House of Representatives in 1893, succeeding William A. Hocker as representative for Lake County, He served until 1895.

References 

Year of birth missing
Year of death missing
Members of the Florida House of Representatives
19th-century American politicians